Zuidschalkwijk was a hamlet in the northwestern Netherlands. It has been annexed by the city of Haarlem and is located about 4 km south of the city centre.

Zuidschalkwijk was a separate municipality between 1817 and 1863, when it was merged with Haarlemmerliede en Spaarnwoude. On October 1, 1963, Zuidschalkwijk was transferred to Haarlem and became part of the Schalkwijk neighbourhood.

References

Former municipalities of North Holland
Populated places in North Holland